The Waratah Shield is a rugby union knock-out competition for high school teams from New South Wales, Australia. First contested in 1963, it is organised by New South Wales Rugby Union in conjunction with NSW Schools' Rugby Union and NSW Combined High Schools and attracts around 100 entries each year. St Edmund's College, Canberra is the most successful school with fourteen victories. The competition was open to all high schools in NSW, until 2004, the ACT was released due to their dominance. 
The Shield was not contested from 2018 until it was relaunched in 2022. The 2022 Finals were live streamed on NSW Rugby TV (where the replays can still be watched) https://nswrugby.tv/rugby-union/schools-rugby/waratah-shield/. Highlights from the Final can be viewed at this link - https://www.youtube.com/watch?v=G9NurqNsZZY&feature=youtu.be

Notable players
Many notable rugby players, including Wallaby greats, took part in the Waratah Shield in their youth.
Many came from St Edmund's College in Canberra, shield winners 14 times.  They include Ricky Stuart in their first title win in 1984 at the Sydney Cricket Ground which brought him to the attention of the sporting public, Matt Giteau, David Furner, George Gregan, Matt Henjak, Anthony Fainga'a and Saia Fainga'a.  Other notable players include Joe Roff also from Canberra who played in Marist College, Canberra's 1992 and 1993 victories, George Smith, Gordon Bray, Mark Ella, Gary Ella, Glen Ella and Lloyd Walker among others.

Number of victories
A total of 18 schools have won the Waratah Shield since it began in 1963. St. Edmund's College, Canberra is the most successful school in the history of the Waratah Shield with a total of 14 victories, seven more than the next most successful schools, St Augustine's College, Brookvale, with eight titles.

Waratah Shield premiers

The following table sets out winners and notable players over the history of the Waratah Shield.

See also
Rugby union trophies and awards

References

External links
Australian Schools Rugby Union
NSW Schools Rugby Union

Rugby union trophies and awards
High school rugby union
Rugby union competitions in New South Wales
Recurring sporting events established in 1963
1963 establishments in Australia
Sports leagues established in 1963